Parastarte is a genus of molluscs in the family Veneridae.

Species
 Parastarte triquetra (Conrad, 1846) – brown gem clam

References

Veneridae
Bivalve genera